Christopher Middleton may refer to:

Christopher Middleton (d. 1628) (1560–1628), English translator and poet
Christopher Middleton (poet) (1926–2015), British poet
Christopher Middleton (navigator) (1770), Royal Navy officer and navigator

See also
Khris Middleton (born 1991), American professional basketball player